1906 film may refer to:
1906 in film
1906 (film), an unreleased film about the 1906 San Francisco earthquake